Polyptychus paupercula is a moth of the family Sphingidae. It is known from forests from Liberia to Uganda.

The length of the forewings is 27–31 mm for males, while females are larger, darker and broader winged. The wings are broader and less acuminate (tapering to a long point) than other Polyptychus species. It is very similar in shape and markings to Andriasa contraria. The forewings are pale greyish brown, with numerous crenulate (scalloped) darker transverse lines, more or less parallel. There is a darker spot near the apex and another at the inner margin, near the tornus. There is also a large rounded orange brown basal dot. The hindwings are pale greyish brown, but the margin is darker, especially near the tornus. There are traces of an inner marginal streak.

Subspecies
Polyptychus paupercula paupercula
Polyptychus paupercula senniger Jordan, 1920

References

Polyptychus
Moths described in 1889
Moths of Africa